Deltote is a genus of moths of the family Noctuidae. The genus was described by Reichenbach in 1817.

Species

Former species
 Deltote albidula is now Protodeltote albidula (Guenée, 1852)
 Deltote indeterminata is now Pseudeustrotia indeterminata (Barnes & McDunnough, 1918)
 Deltote muscosula is now Protodeltote muscosula (Guenée, 1852)

References

Acontiinae